John Thomas Higgins (1874–1916) was an English footballer who played in the Football League for West Bromwich Albion with whom he played in the 1895 FA Cup Final.

References

1874 births
1916 deaths
English footballers
Association football midfielders
Stourbridge F.C. players
West Bromwich Albion F.C. players
English Football League players
FA Cup Final players

Date of birth missing
Date of death missing
People from Halesowen